The Championship by Lexus was a professional golf tournament on the Japan Golf Tour. It was played from 2008 to 2010. It was played at the Otone Country Club in Bandō, Ibaraki. The 2010 purse was ¥150,000,000 with ¥30,000,000 going to the winner. The main sponsor was Lexus.

Winners

External links
Coverage on the Japan Golf Tour's official site

Former Japan Golf Tour events
Defunct golf tournaments in Japan
Sport in Ibaraki Prefecture
Recurring sporting events established in 2008
Recurring sporting events disestablished in 2010
Lexus